Confederate General Robert E. Lee issued his Farewell Address, also known as General Order No. 9 (sometimes Orders) to his Army of Northern Virginia on April 10, 1865, the day after he surrendered the army to Lt. Gen. Ulysses S. Grant. Lee's surrender was instrumental in bringing about the end of the American Civil War. The text of the order, which were written and drafted by Col. Charles Marshall, edited and finalized by Lee, were issued as follows:

The following is taken from a letter dated September 27, 1887, to General Bradley T. Johnson from Colonel Charles Marshall, CSA.

See also

Battle of Appomattox Court House
McLean House (Appomattox, Virginia)

Notes

References
 Freeman, Douglas S., R. E. Lee, A Biography (4 volumes), Scribners, 1934.
 Johnson, Robert Underwood, and Buel, Clarence C. (eds.), Battles and Leaders of the Civil War, Century Co., 1884–1888.

1865 documents
April 1865 events
American Civil War documents
Farewell addresses
General orders
Robert E. Lee
United States documents